TV4 Science Fiction was a television channel dedicated to the science fiction genre owned by the TV4 Group. When the channel was announced, TV4 said that it would launch simultaneously in Denmark, Sweden, Finland, and Norway, becoming the first TV4 channel to launch in all four countries. The channel was launched in Sweden on 29 February 2008 and in Finland the next day. It did however not launch in Denmark and Norway.

In Sweden, the channel was carried from the launch by IPTV distributor Telia Digital-tv and the satellite distributors Viasat and Canal Digital. In Finland, the channel was known as MTV3 Scifi and was a part of the MTV3 channel package. TV4 has entered an agreement with the Norwegian TV 2 Group to launch the channel in Norway under the name TV 2 Science Fiction in 2009. As of February 2009, the channel still wasn't available in Denmark.
The channel was closed during August 2012.

Series that have aired or would have been aired on the channel include:
Andromeda
Babylon 5
Crusade
Dark Angel
Dark Skies
The Dead Zone
Death Note
Doctor Who (original series)
The Greatest American Hero
Last Exile
Masters of Science Fiction
Mutant X
Neon Genesis Evangelion
Prey
Red Dwarf
The Sentinel
Seven Days
Space 1999
Thunderbirds
The Twilight Zone (first revival)
Star Trek: The Original Series
Star Trek: Deep Space Nine
Star Trek: Enterprise
Star Trek: Voyager
Torchwood
Earth 2 (TV series)

References

External links

TV4 AB
Defunct television channels in Sweden
Television channels and stations established in 2008
Television channels and stations disestablished in 2012
2008 establishments in Sweden
2012 disestablishments in Sweden